Government Medical College, Kollam, formerly ESIC Medical College, Parippally, is the first Government medical college in Kollam district, Kerala, India. The College was initially established by the Employees State Insurance Corporation, a Government of India establishment, and later acquired by the Government of Kerala.

History
Initially it was named ESIC medical College and was constructed by the ESI Corporation of India. It was the second medical college project from ESI Corporation of India in the country and the first of its kind in Kerala state. Rs. 480 crores worth ESIC Medical College was inaugurated by Chief Minister Oommen Chandy in Parippally on 21 December 2013, and was the largest Medical College in Kerala the terms of buildings (33 blocks). With the inauguration of the ESI Medical College in Parippally, the demand of the people of Kollam district to have a medical college of their own in the government sector has been fulfilled. Parippally ESIC Medical College is a 500 bedded medical college with a total built-up area of 12,029 sqmtr.

The medical college was initially a project of ESI Corporation. Kodikunnil Suresh, the then Central Deputy Minister of Labour and Employment, announced the ESIC medical college project at Parippally in Kollam during 2012–2013. The works for hospital has been completed and commissioned in December 2013. But in 2014, the NDA lead central ministry decided not to go ahead with ESIC Medical college projects based on a report of the sub-committee that, the projects would probably exhaust the ESI corporation fund. Later in 2016, the UDF lead Kerala Government had decided to take over the institution. But the government failed to appoint needed faculties and other employees for the institution.

Later, in the months of July–August, the LDF lead new government in Kerala had taken the necessary actions for staff appointments to get the first batch of MBBS at ESIC Medical College in 2016-17-year itself. They have created 108 additional posts at the medical college.

On 14 August 2016, Chief Minister of Kerala, Pinarayi Vijayan inaugurated Kollam Government Medical College. A modern mortuary complex, capable to conduct two autopsies at a time, would start functioning in the medical college from 1 August 2019. A forensic medicine department led by a team including a police surgeon, a deputy police surgeon and two assistant police surgeons will also start functioning in the medical college hospital.

Location
The Medical College Hospital is located at Parippally, one of the southern border towns of Kollam District. It is very near to Paravur town. Paravur railway station is the nearest railway station to this hospital.

 Nearest railway station: Paravur railway station
 Nearest major rail head: Kollam Junction()
 Nearest bus stations: Paravur Municipal Bus Stand & Kollam KSRTC Bus Station
 Nearest Sea Port: Kollam Port
 Nearest airport: Trivandrum International Airport
 Nearest city: Kollam
 Nearest town: Paravur

Dimensions

 Total plot area - 33 acre
 Total area of hospital buildings - 14,31,600 sqft(1,33,000 sqmt)
 Total number of buildings - 28

Facilities

 10 Modular Operation theaters
 Physiotherapy
 Occupational Therapy
 Mortuary Complex
 Medical & Non-medical Store
 OP Pharmacy
 Medical Record Section
 Medical Counseling
 Medical Library
 Laundry
 CSSD
 Kitchen Services
 Sewage Treatment Plant
 Civil & Electrical Maintenance
 Quarters for Doctors & other staffs
 Hostel facility for students
 Security Services

First batch of students
The classes for the first batch of medical students at Kollam Government medical college was started on 23 August 2017. Health Minister of Kerala, K. K. Shailaja inaugurated the function in the presence of Chathannoor MLA, G. S. Jayalal, and MP of Kollam Lok Sabha Constituency, N.K. Premachandran.

See also
 Government T D Medical College, Alappuzha

References

Medical colleges in Kollam
Kollam
2013 establishments in Kerala
Hospitals established in 2013
Educational institutions established in 2013
Hospitals in Kollam